Matthew Wiet (born September 23, 1990) is an American former soccer player who last played for the Columbus Crew in Major League Soccer.

Career

Youth, College and Amateur
Wiet attended Worthington Kilbourne High School, where he was named a two-time All-Ohio and All-District honoree and OSSCA First Team selection.  He also played for the Crew Soccer Academy, reaching the U.S. Soccer Under-18 Development Academy National Tournament Semifinals, finishing the 2008 campaign ranked third nationally.
Wiet began his college soccer at Indiana University in 2010, before transferring to UCLA in 2011. At Indiana Wiet was named to the 2009 Big Ten All-Freshman Team after making 20 starts for the Hoosiers. At UCLA he started on the back line for three years and was the three-time recipient of NSCAA All-Region honors.

During his time at UCLA, Wiet also appeared for USL Premier Development League club Ventura County Fusion.

Professional
Wiet signed his first professional contract with USL Pro club Dayton Dutch Lions on July 3, 2013 where he would go on to make four first-team appearances.

On November 26, 2013 Wiet signed a homegrown contract with Major League Soccer club Columbus Crew.

International
Wiet also made an appearance for the U.S. under-20 national team on July 2, 2009 in a 1-1 draw with Egypt.

References

External links

1990 births
Living people
American soccer players
Indiana Hoosiers men's soccer players
UCLA Bruins men's soccer players
Ventura County Fusion players
Dayton Dutch Lions players
Columbus Crew players
Soccer players from Ohio
USL League Two players
USL Championship players
United States men's under-20 international soccer players
Association football defenders
Homegrown Players (MLS)